Belmond–Klemme Community School District (BKCSD) is a rural public school district headquartered in Belmond, Iowa. It operates Belmond–Klemme Junior Senior High School, which has the district headquarters, and Richard O. Jacobson Elementary School.

It is mostly in Hancock and Wright counties, with a small portion in Franklin County. The district serves Belmond, Klemme, Goodell, and Rowan.

History
The district formed on July 1, 1994, with the merger of the Belmond and Klemme districts. The Klemme school building was closed and purchased by a third party in 2000.

The district previously had two elementary school buildings: Ramsay Elementary School and Parker Elementary School. The district drew up plans for a new unified elementary school building along with other improvements. In October 2004 the district began attempting to have a bond for school reconstruction passed, but the bond efforts failed the first four times. The fifth attempt, for $6.27 million, was presented in September 2006. The bond required at least 60% of the voters to approve. The vote succeeded on a 1286-801 basis, with 61.62% approving.
In September 2006 the district passed a bond referendum to build a new preschool - 6th grade elementary building (Richard O. Jacobson Elementary) just north of the existing 7–12 Jr./Sr. High. The district has already completed the phase of building new baseball/softball fields; additionally the Jr./Sr. High just completed a renovation in August 2013 allowing for increased security measures and geothermal heating and cooling (similar to the Jacobson Elementary). The district is also adding handicapped accessibility to the baseball and softball fields and adding playground handicapped accessibility equipment.

In 2010, Belmond–Klemme's Don Dye (high school English) won the top teacher award from Live with Regis and Kelly.

B-K has shown growth in student counts during the 2010–2014 academic years.  Currently over 800 students are served in grades K–12.

Schools
The district operates three schools, all in Belmond:
 Richard O. Jacobson Elementary School
 Belmond–Klemme Alternative School
 Belmond–Klemme Community Jr.-Sr. High School

Belmond–Klemme Community Jr.-Sr. High School

Athletics
The Broncos participate in the Top of Iowa Conference in the following sports:
Football
Cross Country
Volleyball
Basketball
Golf
Track and Field

See also
List of school districts in Iowa
List of high schools in Iowa

References

Further reading
 2006 Bond Referendum Ballot

External links
 Belmond–Klemme Community School District
 

School districts in Iowa
Education in Hancock County, Iowa
Education in Wright County, Iowa
Education in Franklin County, Iowa
1994 establishments in Iowa
School districts established in 1994